Patiyo Tambwe (born 7 January 1984) is a Congolese football striker who plays for V.League 1 side Sanna Khánh Hòa BVN. He has also played for the Congo DR national team.

In December 2012, he moved to Vietnam and signed a contract with Thanh Hóa. With Quảng Nam, he was the top scorer for the 2015 V.League 1 season, scoring 18 goals.

References

External links

Democratic Republic of the Congo footballers
Democratic Republic of the Congo international footballers
1984 births
Living people
K.S.C. Lokeren Oost-Vlaanderen players
Hacettepe S.K. footballers
Gençlerbirliği S.K. footballers
R.W.D.M. Brussels F.C. players
Thanh Hóa FC players
Can Tho FC players
Challenger Pro League players
Belgian Pro League players
Süper Lig players
V.League 1 players
Democratic Republic of the Congo expatriate footballers
Expatriate footballers in Belgium
Expatriate footballers in Turkey
Expatriate footballers in Vietnam
Association football forwards